Samuel Cook Silliman (also Samuel Cook Syllyman) (November 12, 1742 – February 14, 1795) was a member of the Connecticut House of Representatives from Norwalk. He served several non-consecutive terms starting in 1779 and ending in 1794.

He was a member of the Connecticut House of Representatives in all of the following sessions:
May 1779
May 1780, October 1780
October 1781, May 1782
May 1783, October 1783
October 1784, May 1785, October 1785
October 1786, May 1787, October 1787
October 1788, May 1789, October 1789
May 1791
May 1792, October 1792
May 1794, October 1794

Constitutional delegate 
On November 12, 1787, the inhabitants of the town of Norwalk had a town meeting with Colonel Thomas Fitch as moderator. Silliman and Hezekiah Rogers were chosen as delegates to meet in a convention at Hartford, following January to ratify the United States Constitution. Connecticut ratified the Constitution on January 8, 1788, making it the fifth state to do so.

References 

1742 births
1795 deaths
Members of the Connecticut House of Representatives
Politicians from Norwalk, Connecticut
Connecticut militiamen in the American Revolution
Military personnel from Connecticut
18th-century American politicians